Wheelchair rugby was one of the 23 sports featured at the 2nd Asian Para Games 2014, which took place in Incheon, South Korea on October 16–24, 2014. This was the first time that wheelchair rugby had been included at the Games, and was contested by four nations. The winners were Japan.

Tournament
Four teams contested the 2014 Asian Para Games Wheelchair Rugby tournament. The preliminary round consisted of a group stage where the teams were placed into a single league which was contested as a round-robin. All the teams faced each other twice. The two top teams of the league would then face each other to contest the gold and silver medals, whilst the bottom two teams would play to contest the bronze medal. The eventual winners, Japan, finished the competition unbeaten.

Preliminary round

Medal round
Bronze medal match

Gold medal match

Notes

2014 Asian Para Games events
Asia
Asia
2014 in Asian rugby union
International rugby union competitions hosted by South Korea